Pit Er Pat is a post-rock band from Chicago Illinois. They formed in 2002 as the trio of Fay Davis-Jeffers on keyboard and vocals, former founding member of Alkaline Trio Rob Doran on bass, and Butchy Fuego on drums. Their sound is very atmospheric and has a dark ambience that is similar to other instrumental avant-garde groups. Much of the group's offerings are rhythmically complex as well. 

The group released nine records between 2004–2008, touring extensively throughout the United States, Europe, and Mexico. After the album "High Time" was released in October 2008, Doran left the group for other pursuits. In the spring of 2009, Fuego and Davis-Jeffers toured as a duo for the first time, performing all new music. The tour included a performance at All Tomorrow's Parties festival in Minehead, England.

In 2004, Pit Er Pat performed on the second volume of the Burn to Shine DVD series. On July 7, 2007, Butchy Fuego participated in the Yamantaka Eye (Boredoms) lead drum collaboration/concert 77 Boadrum at Empire-Fulton Ferry State Park in Brooklyn, New York.

On their 2007 Covers EP, Pit Er Pat had guest instrumentalist add some woodwind and brass to their sound. Billy Blaze played flute and tenor saxophone, and Nick Broste (Mucca Pazza) played trombone.

Discography
Pit Er Pat has released music in the United States under the Thrill Jockey, Overcoat Recordings, Mythologies and BAROS records, and in Japan through the Headz label.

 The Babies Are Tired/Lullaby (12-inch) - Baros - 2004
 Emergency EP (CD) - Overcoat Recordings - 2004
 "Emergency" (LP) - Mythologies - 2004
 "Big Pants/Jump Off" (split 7-inch w/ Icy Demons) - Polyvinyl Record Co. - 2004
 Shakey (CD/LP) - Thrill Jockey - 2005
 3D Message EP (CD) - Thrill Jockey - 2006
 Pyramids (CD/LP) - Thrill Jockey - 2006
 "Feel No Pain" (CD) - Self-Released - 2007
 Covers EP	- Thrill Jockey - 2007
 High Time (CD/LP) - Thrill Jockey - 2008
 "High Time Remix" (12-inch) - Thrill Jockey - 2009
 The Flexible Entertainer (CD/LP) - Thrill Jockey - 2010

References

External links
 www.piterpat.com Official site.
 Butchy Fuego at MySpace
 Label Site at Thrill Jockey
 Rob Doran art site
 Interview with Centerstage Chicago (July 2005)

Indie rock musical groups from Illinois
Musical groups from Chicago